Bambi Jones (born 1931), also known as Doris Kotzan was born in Holyoke, Massachusetts. She is known for being the Original Burlesque dancer, Vedette and author of her new book My Journey BURLESQUE The Way It Was. She appeared in the documentary Exotic World & The Burlesque Revival.

History
Bambi Jones was born in Holyoke, Massachusetts. Bambi Jones admired the movie stars of the 1940s. At age 17, she moved to the bright lights to pursue her career in show biz. She worked in a hotel bar and would always dance to the jukebox there. A photographer from McVann's night club saw talent in Bambi Jones and invited her to dance for their club. She loved to dance so she took the job. She would later be scouted by an ex-Rockette and appear on burlesque stages throughout South America, Mexico, Canada, and the United States as "Bambi Jones".

The Burlesque Hall of Fame named her the 2021 winner of the Living Legend Award.

References

External links

 
 My Journey BURLESQUE The Way it Was
 Exotic Word & The Burlesque Revival

American vedettes
American burlesque performers
1931 births
Living people
People from Holyoke, Massachusetts
Dancers from Massachusetts